Ksenija Atanasijević (Xenia Atanassievich) (1894–1981) was the first recognised major female Serbian philosopher, and the first female professors of Belgrade University, where she graduated. She wrote about Giordano Bruno, ancient Greek philosophy and the history of Serbian philosophy, and translated important philosophical works into Serbian, including works by Aristotle, Plato, and Spinoza. She was also an early Serbian feminist writer and philosopher.

Biography 
Ksenija Atanasijević was born on February 5, 1894, in Belgrade, the youngest of six children to Doctor Svetozar Atanasijević and Jelena Atanasijević, née Čumić, who died while giving her birth. Her father was a well-respected doctor and director of the State Hospital in Belgrade. Her mother's family was related to the famed Belgrade lawyer, writer and politician Aćim Čumić. Twelve years later, her father died. Ksenija's stepmother, Sofija Kondić, who taught at the Women's College (Viša ženska škola) in Belgrade, became her rightful guardian. Kondić was well-qualified to continue Ksenija's education. From Kondić Ksenija received her first lessons in philosophy: she learned quickly and eagerly, and no sooner another tragedy befall on her. Ksenija's older brother was killed in World War I.

Ksenija's best friends while growing up were poet Rastko Petrović and his sister, painter Nadežda Petrović.

Scholarship 

While Ksenija attended the Lyceum, she was also influenced by Nada Stoiljković, her philosophy professor. Stoiljković suggested that Ksenija should take up philosophy with her former professor at Belgrade, Branislav Petronijević, and so, in the autumn of 1918, Ksenija Atanasijevic became Petronijevic's pupil at the University of Belgrade.

Authoritarian and demanding, Petronijević was exactly what Ksenija needed at that point. A brilliant professor and one of the most famous philosophers of his day in Serbia and elsewhere, he was a hard taskmaster.

Petronijević's aim was to challenge his pupils to be able to maintain a philosophical discussion with their tutor. Ksenija was one of the most brilliant students ever to attend the university and it was not long before she attracted the attention of Belgrade's most distinguished intellectuals. She graduated in July 1920 with the highest marks in her graduating class, obtaining a university diploma in "pure and applied philosophy and classics." An excellent student, she decided to pursue an academic career in philosophy and soon after graduation, began working on a doctoral thesis on Giordano Bruno's De triplici minimo. She went to Geneva and Paris to seek out rare philosophical works and to discuss her thesis with specialists in the field, and on January 20, 1922, defended her Ph.D with honors in Belgrade before a panel of academics, including rector Jovan Cvijić, Mihailo Petrović, Milutin Milanković, Veselin Čajkanović, and Branislav Petronijević, her mentor. After her thesis was successfully defended, she became the first woman to hold a Ph.D. in the Kingdom of Serbs, Croats, and Slovenes. She was then 28 years old.

Recognition 

In 1924, she became the first female university professor to be appointed to the Arts Faculty, Department of Philosophy at the University of Belgrade, where she taught classics, medieval and modern philosophy and aesthetics for twelve years. During her teaching career, she was a committed feminist both in theory and practice. She was a member of the Serbian Women's League for Peace and Freedom, the Women's Movement Alliance, and editor of the first feminist journal in the country, "The Women's Movement" (Ženski pokret), published from 1920 to 1938.

At the time the Encyclopædia Britannica cited her study, The Metaphysical and Geometrical Doctrine of Bruno, written in French in Paris in 1924 as an authoritative work about an important and often neglected aspect of Bruno's philosophy. Her consequent dismissal caused a considerably outcry in Belgrade among intellectuals. At a public meeting where many people spoke in support of her, the most prominent speakers were law professor Živojin M. Perić and poets Rastko Petrović and Sima Pandurović.

Atanasijević's life 1936–1946 

Pandurović, who stood by her throughout the ordeal, was quoted in a newspaper article saying: "She has been accused at the plenum of the University Council of plagiarism by one member of the faculty who has not the remotest inkling of philosophy and who has unaccountably taken it on himself to defend that discipline from a genuine thinker."

Despite the support Atanasijević received, however, her position at the university was never restored to her, and she spent the rest of her working life—until 1941—as an inspector for the Ministry of Education. World War II brought troubles and unrest, even for the apolitical Ksenija Atanasijević. After writing articles against anti-Semitism and National Socialism, she was arrested by the Gestapo in 1942.  Then when the war ended, Atansijević was arrested again, but this time by Tito's communists on charges of war crimes, like those attributed to Veselin Čajkanović and others for teaching during Nazi occupation. Once released, she retired in 1946 after a short stint as an employee of the National Library of Serbia.

Legacy 

Ksenija Atansijević left a substantial volume of work, including more than 400 texts, among them books and essays in philosophy, psychology, history, and literature. Her interest in philosophy was broad and eclectic, covering ethics, metaphysics, logic, aesthetics and the history of philosophy. She is best known for her original interpretations of Giordano Bruno's work and for her 'philosophy of meaning' developed in Filozofski fragmenti (Philosophical fragments, 1928–1929), considered by many to be her most important and significant work. She died in Belgrade in 1981.

Selected works 

Brunovo učenje o najmanjem, Belgrade, 1922.
Počeci filozofiranja kod Grka, Belgrade, 1928.
Filozofski fragmenti I-II, Belgrade, 1929-30.
La doctrine métaphysique et géométrique de Bruno, Bg et Paris 1923.
L'Atomisme d’Epicure, Paris 1928.
Un fragment philosophique, Belgrade, 1929.
Considération sur le monde et la vie dans la littérature populaire des Yougoslaves, Paris 1929/30.
Die gegenwärtigen philosophishen Strömungen in Jugoslawien – Der russische Gedanke, Internationale Zeitschrift für Philosophie, Bonn, 3, 1930.
Die Anfänge des Philosophiernes bei den Griechen, 1928.
Organon, a translation
Ethics, a translation

See also
 Ljubomir Nedić
 Branislav Petronijević
 Milan Kujundžić
 Petar II Petrović Njegoš

References

Bibliography
Brunovo ucenje o najmanjem, Vreme, 1922
Star grcka atomistika, Ujedinjenje, 1927
La doctrine metaphysique de Bruno, Paris/Belgrade, 1933, published in English: The metaphysical and Geometric doctrine of Bruno, Translated by George Vid Tomashevich, St. Louis, Mo: W. H. Green, 1972
Sama pod suncem, 1939
Braca Eutidem i Dionisodor

1894 births
1981 deaths
Serbian feminists
Serbian women philosophers
Academic staff of the University of Belgrade
University of Belgrade Faculty of Philosophy alumni
20th-century Serbian philosophers
Scholars of ancient Greek philosophy
Historians of philosophy
Writers from Belgrade
Serbian women's rights activists
20th-century Serbian women writers
20th-century Serbian writers
Yugoslav philosophers